Events in the year 1876 in Argentina.

Incumbents
 President: Nicolás Avellaneda
 Vice President: Mariano Acosta

Governors
 Buenos Aires Province: Carlos Casares 
 Cordoba: Enrique Rodríguez 
 Mendoza Province: Francisco Civit (until 16 October); Joaquín Villanueva (from 16 October)
 Santa Fe Province: Servando Bayo

Vice Governors
 Buenos Aires Province: Luis Sáenz Peña

Events

Births
February 26 - Agustín Pedro Justo, president 1932-1938
Date unknown
 Pedro Sacaggio, engineer and inventor (d. 1959)

Deaths

 
1870s in Argentina
History of Argentina (1852–1880)
Years of the 19th century in Argentina